The 2015–16 season was an eventful one for Walsall. The club had four different managers on the way to a third-place finish in League One, one point away from promotion.
Defeat to Barnsley in the playoff semi-finals meant the campaign ended in disappointment, but still represented the Saddlers' highest league placing in 12 years.

Story of the season
The summer of 2015 saw relatively minor changes to the Saddlers squad. 2014-15 Player of the Year Richard O'Donnell departed and was replaced by Neil Etheridge, while other notable incomings included fullback Jason Demetriou and the return of forward Milan Lalkovic.

Strong start

Things got off to a flying start, with the Saddlers winning six of their first seven games in all competitions. This included League Cup wins over Championship opponents Nottingham Forest and Brighton, setting up a third round meeting with reigning Premier League champions Chelsea. Walsall were beaten 4–1, but received praise from Chelsea manager Jose Mourinho for the club’s attractive style of play.

Managerial merry go round

The Saddlers’ good form continued and a 2–1 win over Bradford in late November left the club in fourth, three points of the top with a game in hand. However, just two days later it was announced that manager Dean Smith was leaving to charge at Championship Brentford. A caretaker trio of Jon Whitney, Neil Cutler and John Ward oversaw victory away at rivals Shrewsbury and progress to the FA Cup Third Round, before Sean O'Driscoll was appointed as Smith’s replacement.

The new boss got off to a bright start, with three successive wins and clean sheets. The Saddlers also got the better of old boss Smith with a 1–0 win away at Brentford in the FA Cup Third Round. However, things soon took a turn for the worse with the club going on a run of just two wins in 11 games. After just 16 games in charge, O’Driscoll was dismissed with the club sitting fourth five points off an automatic promotion spot with a game in hand.

Pipped by a point

Whitney was placed in temporary charge until the end of the season and the team responded with three successive victories. With league leaders Wigan Athletic having pulled away, the Saddlers were left to battle with Burton Albion and Gillingham for second spot. While the latter’s challenge faded, Burton matched the Saddlers’ efforts, meaning Walsall went into the final day of the season needing to overturn a three point deficit as well as achieving a goal difference swing of three goals on the Brewers. A 5–0 win away at Port Vale achieved the latter, but Burton’s 0–0 draw with Doncaster saw them promoted ahead of the Saddlers by one point.

A third-place finish meant Walsall would take on in-form Barnsley in the playoffs. The Tykes proved too much for the Saddlers, convincingly winning 3–0 at Oakwell and 3–1 at the Bescot. The Yorkshire side would go on to gain promotion by beating Millwall in the final.

The Saddlers’ young fullback Rico Hery and playmaker Romaine Sawyers were included in the official League one Team of the Season.

Transfers

Transfers in

Transfers out

Loans out

Competitions

Pre-season friendlies
On 7 May 2015, Walsall announced a pre-season friendly against Luton Town. Also Walsall would face West Bromwich Albion, AFC Telford United, Rushall Olympic and Chasetown. On 28 May 2015, Walsall added Aston Villa to their pre-season schedule.

League One

League table

Matches
On 17 June 2015, the fixtures for the forthcoming season were announced.

Play Off

FA Cup

League Cup
On 16 June 2015, the first round draw was made, Walsall were drawn away against Nottingham Forest. In the second round Walsall were drawn at home against Brighton & Hove Albion.

Football League Trophy
On 8 August 2015, live on Soccer AM the draw for the first round of the Football League Trophy was drawn by Toni Duggan and Alex Scott.

Birmingham Senior Cup
On the Birmingham FA website the first round details were announced, Walsall will face Rugby Town.

Squad statistics
Source:

Numbers in parentheses denote appearances as substitute.
Players with squad numbers struck through and marked  left the club during the playing season.
Players with names in italics and marked * were on loan from another club for the whole of their season with Walsall.
Players listed with no appearances have been in the matchday squad but only as unused substitutes.
Key to positions: GK – Goalkeeper; DF – Defender; MF – Midfielder; FW – Forward

References

Walsall
Walsall F.C. seasons